Saoli Assembly constituency was one of the 288 assembly constituencies of  Maharashtra a western state of India. Saoli was also part of Chandrapur Lok Sabha constituency.

Member of Legislative Assembly
 1962: Marotrao Kannamwar, Indian National Congress
 1962 (by polls): Waman Gandamwar, Indian National Congress
 1967: Waman Gandamwar, Indian National Congress
 1972: Bhagirath Bajaj, Indian National Congress
 1978: Deorao Bhandekar, Indian National Congress (I)
 1980: Mahadeo Tajane, Indian National Congress (I)
 1985: Waman Vistari Gandamwar, Indian National Congress
 1990: Shobhatai Fadnavis, Bharatiya Janata Party
 1995: Shobhatai Fadnavis, Bharatiya Janata Party
 1999: Shobhatai Fadnavis, Bharatiya Janata Party
 2004: Shobhatai Fadnavis, Bharatiya Janata Party

See also
 Saoli
 Chandrapur district
 List of constituencies of Maharashtra Legislative Assembly

References

Chandrapur district
Former assembly constituencies of Maharashtra